A Central Committee of the League of Communists of Croatia was elected by the 11th Congress, and was in session from 1989 to 1990.

Members
Listed by members receiving highest number of votes:
 Ivo Družić 
 Ivica Račan
 Branko Caratan
 Jelica Bobić
 Boris Malada
 Ivan Gržetić
 Nada Ciković
 Hela Dragović
 Zvjezdana Grudić
 Ivan Hanžek
 Ivan Matija
 Dušan Plećaš
 Ivo Aničić
 Igor Antončić
 Ivan Babić
 Marija Babić
 Slavica Babić
 Darko Bakarić
 Milutin Baltić
 Vera Ban-Marković
 Serđo Baskijera
 Ivica Bašić
 Dušan Bilandžić
 Aleksandar Broz
 Ivica Car
 Darko Crnković
 Mirko Cvjetičanin
 Marija Erceg
 Ivica Fabris
 Božo Farkaš
 Josip Filipović
 Božidar Frančić
 Franjo Galeković
 Ivan Gajer
 Ante Bilić
 Dragutin Grđan
 Josip Gudelj
 Željko Hapek
 Antun Ignac
 Ivo Jelavić
 Ante Jelčić
 Ivica Jerčinović
 Marin Jurjević
 Branko Jurlina
 Ante Krstulović
 Sveto Letica
 Marko Lolić
 Jelena Lovrić
 Zdenko Mance
 Ivan Marković
 Vili Matula
 Luka Miletić
 Luka Obradović
 Tatjana Olujić-Musić,
 Jože Perić
 Antun Peruško
 Jure Premuž
 Nada Rudan
 Boris Santo
 Zorica Stipetić
 Ivan Šifter
 Marija Šola
 Zdravko Tomac
 Lordan Zafranović
 Ratimir Žanetić
 Ivica Župetić
 Branko Žuža
 Tome Bacelić
 Mirjana Bezbradica
 Silva Bukvić
 Božo Čapeta
 Boris Garek
 Ignjatije Malobabić
 Danijel Vereš 
 Jadranka Višnjić

Bibliography

Komunist, 15 December 1989

League of Communists of Croatia